Colin Stanley Winchester  (18 October 1933 – 10 January 1989) was an assistant commissioner in the Australian Federal Police (AFP). Winchester commanded ACT Police, the community policing component of the AFP responsible for the Australian Capital Territory. In 1989 he was assassinated by an unknown perpetrator.

Background
Winchester, the son of a baker, worked as a miner near  before joining the Australian Capital Territory Police Force in 1962, aged 29 years. The ACT Police and Commonwealth Police were merged in 1979 to form the Australian Federal Police (AFP).

Death
On 10 January 1989, at about 9:15 pm, Winchester was shot twice in the head with a Ruger 10/22 .22-calibre semi-automatic rifle fitted with a suppressor and killed as he parked his car in the driveway of his neighbour’s premises in Deakin, Canberra. Winchester is Australia's most senior police officer to have been murdered. At the time of Winchester's murder, it was alleged that Winchester was corrupt; at any earlier period when it was said that he had handled bribes relating to a Canberra illegal casino. However, an audit of Winchester's financial affairs after his murder revealed nothing untoward. There were also allegations of 'Ndrangheta or Mafia involvement in his murder. The story of Winchester's murder was dramatised in Police Crop: The Winchester Conspiracy.

Murder suspects

David Eastman

Prior to Winchester's murder, David Harold Eastman, a 44-year-old former Treasury Department economist, had made threats against Winchester's life.

In 1995 Eastman was tried and convicted of the murder of Winchester and was sentenced to life imprisonment without parole. During the 85-day trial, Eastman repeatedly sacked his legal team and eventually chose to represent himself. Eastman also abused the judge during his trial, and during later legal proceedings and appeals. Subsequent to his conviction, Eastman continuously appealed against his conviction, attempting to win a retrial on the basis that he was mentally unfit during his original trial. On 27 May 2009, Eastman was transferred from the Goulburn Correctional Centre in New South Wales to the ACT's Alexander Maconochie Centre to see out his sentence.

A new inquiry relating to his conviction was announced in August 2012. In 2014, the inquiry, headed by Justice Brian Ross Martin, found there had been "a substantial miscarriage of justice", Eastman "did not receive a fair trial", the forensic evidence on which the conviction was based was "deeply flawed" and recommended the conviction be quashed. However Martin said he was "fairly certain" Eastman was guilty but "a nagging doubt remains".

In 2016 it was reported that the ACT Government sought a retrial of Eastman over the murder of Winchester; and that the legal precedings had cost the ACT Government approximately 30 million. Meanwhile, Eastman lodged a civil claim against the ACT Government seeking compensation for wrongful imprisonment; and on 14 October 2019 Eastman was awarded 7.02 million in compensation.

On 22 November 2018, Eastman was found not guilty of Winchester's murder after a lengthy re-trial.

Other suspects 
In media reports following the quashing of Eastman's wrongful conviction and the subsequent retrial, it was reported that Winchester's death may be linked to connections associated with the 'Ndrangheta.

Legacy

Following his murder the Winchester Police Centre, located in Benjamin Way, Belconnen, was established in 1994 as the headquarters for ACT Police. The Winchester Police Centre houses ACT Police Executive, administrative and support sections and elements of the Territory Investigations Group (TIG).

References

External links

1933 births
1989 deaths
Male murder victims
Australian Federal Police
Recipients of the Australian Police Medal
People murdered in the Australian Capital Territory
Deaths by firearm in the Australian Capital Territory
Chief Police Officers of ACT Policing
1989 in Australia
Coroner's investigations in Australia